Microcaecilia grandis is a species of caecilian in the family Siphonopidae. It is endemic to Suriname and only known from the Lely Mountains.

References

grandis
Amphibians described in 2011
Amphibians of Suriname
Endemic fauna of Suriname